Pape Cheikh Diouf (born 1973) known by his stage name Pape Diouf, is a musical artist from Dakar, Senegal.

Career 
Initially, he was groomed by his uncle to become a plumber but he found his calling in music. At the age of 22, he joined the Lemzo Diamono musical group and became widely recognized with few major singles. He went solo after 1998 and formed La Génération Consciente group after a couple of years. Over the years, he has extensively contributed towards the revival of Dakar's classic Mbalax music. He toured USA and Canada, among other countries, in 2016.

Discography

Awards

References

External links 
 Official Website
 iTunes

Living people
1973 births
People from Dakar
21st-century Senegalese male singers